Duyong is a state constituency in Malacca, Malaysia, that has been represented in the Melaka State Legislative Assembly.

Demographics

History

Polling districts
According to the gazette issued on 31 October 2022, the Duyong constituency has a total of 6 polling districts.

Representation history

Election Results

References

 

Malacca state constituencies